Tonoloway may refer to:

Tonoloway Creek, also known as Great Tonoloway Creek, a tributary of the Potomac River in Maryland and Pennsylvania
Little Tonoloway Creek (Pennsylvania), a tributary of Tonoloway Creek in Pennsylvania
Little Tonoloway Creek (Maryland), a tributary of the Potomac River in Maryland
Tonoloway Ridge, a mountain ridge that runs southwest northeast through Pennsylvania, Maryland, and West Virginia
Fort Tonoloway State Park, a Maryland state park in Washington County
Tonoloway Formation, a limestone bedrock unit in the Appalachian Mountains